is a hentai anime two-part series about five schoolgirls with supernatural powers who must defend the Earth from the Evil Inma Empire and their leader, Necros. It is a pornographic parody or rip-off of the Sailor Moon series, mostly in regards to the heroines and heroes. Venus 5 is created by Jin Ara.

The title was created and produced in Japan in 1994 and released in North America by Central Park Media's Anime 18 imprint. It is directed by Osamu Inoue and written by Wataru Amano (screenplay) and Jin Ara (creator). There are only two parts to the series: The first is "The Inma Ball" and the sequel is "Labyrinth of the Inma".

Overview 
The basic premise is that the Greek Goddess Aphrodite has secretly recruited 5 schoolgirls on earth to be her Venus Warriors. They are bestowed supernatural powers whenever they transform. There is Venus Pink, Venus Blue, Venus Green, Venus Red, and Venus Purple. They will be earth's only defense against a perverted force known as the Inma Empire. The leader of the Inma Empire is Necros, daughter of the Greek God Apollo (who in this series is the God of Lust). The Inma seek to resurrect Apollo and dominate the world, turning it into a perverted sexual empire.

Hikari is Venus Pink, also the leader of the Venus 5. At the beginning of the story, she learns of her destiny from a talking cat named Buccha. He is a servant of Aphrodite and is sent to earth to aid and instruct the Venus 5. Unfortunately, the girls do not know that they have been selected to be Venus Warriors, and Buccha must find them and inform them of their secret identities. Every Venus warrior has a secret Venus mark on her body, a symbol that marks them as one of the Venus 5.

The series is predominated by strong sexual themes, nudity, and gratuitous sex, but has mild violence.

Characters

Venus team
Hikari Misono / Venus Pink: A natural blonde Japanese student of Golden Star Academy. She has good judgement and is friendly, though she also has a bit of a mean streak. She has a pink Venus mark on her stomach. VA: Junko Asami
Kiyomi Mikawa / Venus Blue: Hikari's best friend. Quickly labeled a 'brain' due to her looks and modest personality. She has a blue Venus mark on her right breast.  VA: Yumi Fukami
Ikumi Mihara / Venus Green: Recently enrolled at Golden Star, Ikumi is soft-spoken and kind hearted, but has a tough side due to her involvement in a gang from her previous school. She has a green Venus mark on her left thigh. VA: Fumika Kudō
Moyu Miyama / Venus Red: A fairly snobby rich girl who attends Golden Star, but she lightens up once she gets acquainted by the rest of the Venus team. She has a red Venus mark on her buttocks. VA: Rie Iwatsubo
Ai Misora / Venus Purple: Local young movie actress who attends Golden Star. She was the only member of the Venus 5 to be discovered by the Inma Empire in 'Inma Ball'. She has the dirtiest mind of the Venus 5 as she is a closet masochist. She has a purple Venus mark on her back. VA: Junko Sakuma
Buccha: Somewhat perverted, but otherwise dutiful feline lackey of Aphrodite assigned to gather and train the Venus 5. VA: Kenichi Ogata
Aphrodite: Greek goddess who is intent on saving Earth from the clutches of the Inma Empire with the Venus 5's help, though she's very snobby. VA: Masami Toyoshima
Ken Kanagawa: A mysterious student at Golden Star who is at first shady and suspicious to the Venus 5. Buccha reveals him to be Apollo Junior.

The Inma Lords
Empress Necros / Dean Narumi: Perverted ruler of the Inma Empire who is partly futanari. She assumes the disguise of Golden Star's dean. VA: Yumi Takada
Marquis Saturn / Hiroto Tsuchiya: Duke of the Inma Empire who often acts as its omni-man. He assumes the disguise of the school's top English teacher. VA: Daiki Nakamura
Count Uranus / Yoshihiro Amano: Count of the Empire who features a snake-like twin that protrudes from his stomach and almost always commands the Empire's goblin-like scouts. He assumes the disguise of the school's top math teacher. VA: Takehiro Murozono
Viscount Neptune / Hiroshi Umino: Viscount of the Inma Empire who has a strong sense of smell and is the only Inma lord with a second face on his stomach and tentacles, though he never uses them. He assumes the role of the school's top biology teacher. VA: Hiroshi Yanaka
Baron Pluto / Hideki Meino: Baron of the Inma Empire who also sports a serpentine twin on his body and has X-ray vision he uses to locate the Venus symbols. He assumes the role of the school's top Physical Education teacher. VA: Kunihiko Yasui
Emperor Nero: Abusive, crabby and eccentric old elf put in charge of watching Apollo's casket, seen only in Labyrinth of the Inma.

References

External links

1994 anime OVAs
Anime 18
Hentai anime and manga
Magical girl anime and manga